Nanjala Nyabola is a writer, political analyst, and activist based in Nairobi, Kenya.

Nyabola writes extensively about African society and politics, technology, international law, and feminism for academic and non-academic publications. Her first book Digital Democracy, Analogue Politics: How the Internet Era is Transforming Kenya (Zed Books, 2018) was described as "a must read for all researchers and journalists writing about Kenya today".

Nyabola held a Rhodes Scholarship at Harris Manchester College, University of Oxford in 2009, was part of the 2017 inaugural cohort of Foreign Policy Interrupted Fellows, and was a 2017 Logan Nonfiction Program Fellow at the Carey Institute for Global Good.

Nyabola sits on the board of Amnesty International Kenya.

Education 
Nyabola holds multiple degrees in politics and law:

 BA African Studies and Political Science, University of Birmingham
 MSc Forced Migration, University of Oxford
 MSc African Studies, University of Oxford
 J.D. from Harvard Law School

Journalism 
Nyabola writes extensively about African society and politics, in particular Kenya, alongside discussions of technology, international law, and feminism. Her work has featured in publications and outlets including African Arguments, Al Jazeera, Financial Times, Foreign Affairs, Foreign Policy, The Guardian, New African, The New Humanitarian, The New Inquiry, New Internationalist, OkayAfrica and World Policy Journal.

Her 2014 Al Jazeera opinion piece "Why do Western media get Africa wrong?" generated much discussion, including on the BBC World Service and in a 2014 McGill University course syllabus on Western representations of Africa in media and pop culture.

Her 2010 Guardian opinion piece "Why, as an African, I took a Rhodes scholarship" was chosen as one of the 5 Best Wednesday Columns in The Atlantic.

Public speaking 

Nyabola is a frequent contributor to the BBC World Service, particularly on issues around Kenyan politics and technology.

She is a prolific speaker at universities including discussions of African politics, specifically Kenya, migration, feminism, and the digital at the University of Edinburgh, SOAS, Stanford University.

Nyabola has been an invited speaker at numerous international conferences on the politics of the digital, including re:publica 2018 and 2019, the 2018 Forum on Internet Freedom in Africa, and the 2019 RightsCon in Tunis. She gave the opening keynote at the 2022 Association of Internet Researchers conference.

Works

Books 
Travelling While Black: Essays Inspired by a Life on the Move is a collection of essays published in 2020 by Hurst Publishers,. The essays analyse the radicalised experience of travelling as "a middle-class, mobile, Black African female" and is interspersed with "personal stories that are witty, moving, unsettling, and harrowing in turn". The book has been positively received and featured in The Times Literary Supplement and NPR amongst others. Ranka Primorac writes that the book "has sharp and urgent things to say about racism in America, xenophobia in Africa, and the future of Pan-Africanism".

Digital Democracy, Analogue Politics: How the Internet Era is Transforming Politics in Kenya was published in 2018 by Zed Books. A review in African Studies Quarterly described it as a "highly refreshing, innovative, and descriptive narrative sheds light on contemporary Kenya, highlighting the impact of technology on its political and social systems". It received positive reviews from LSE Review of Books, Duncan Green, Business Daily Africa, between the lines podcast from the Institute of Development Studies and the Africa Oxford Initiative podcast at the University of Oxford. She has given book talks at numerous universities including the Berkman Klein Center for Internet & Society at Harvard University, the University of the Witwatersrand, School of International and Public Affairs, Columbia University, Stanford University Center on Philanthropy and Civil Society and the University of Cambridge. The book is cited in a Financial Times article on the fight to control Africa's digital revolution.

Where Women Are: Gender & The 2017 Kenyan Elections was published in 2018 by Heinrich-Boell-Stiftung and Twaweza Communications Ltd and co-edited with Marie-Emmanuelle Pommerolle.

Book chapters 
"Testimony as Text: Performative Vulnerability and the Limits of Legalistic Approaches to Refugee Protection"

 in African Women Under Fire: Literary Discourses in War and Conflict, published in 2017 by Rowman & Littlefield.

"Media Perspectives: Social Media and New Narratives: Kenyans Tweet Back"

 Chapter in Africa's Media Image in the 21st Century: From the 'Heart of Darkness' to 'Africa Rising', published in 2016 by Routledge

References

External links 
 

Living people
Year of birth missing (living people)
Kenyan academics
Feminist writers
Kenyan journalists
Kenyan women journalists
21st-century Kenyan women writers
21st-century journalists
Kenyan Rhodes Scholars
Alumni of Harris Manchester College, Oxford
Alumni of the University of Birmingham
Harvard Law School alumni